The Norwegian Women's Lobby (NWL) is a feminist policy and advocacy organization in Norway, and is described as the country's "main, national, umbrella organization" for women's rights. NWL is inclusive, promotes intersectional feminism and "works to represent the interests of all those who identify as women and girls." The implementation of the CEDAW treaty is a major focus for NKL, and it works to enhance the implementation, visibility and relevance of CEDAW within politics and society. It states that it "brings together both the key women’s organisations and the leading experts on women’s rights in Norway" and that it has a focus on being a "cooperation partner for the government [and] to contribute to the representation of the Norwegian women's movement in international forums." NWL has stated that "NWL understands discrimination against girls and women in an intersectional perspective and is against, among other things, racism, homophobia, transphobia and ableism."

It has ten member organizations with a total of nearly 50,000 members and was founded in 2014 by the Norwegian women's organisations on the initiative of the Norwegian Association for Women's Rights, and in accordance with the recommendations of the government-appointed Gender Equality Commission. It was inspired by the European Women's Lobby and also corresponds to comparable umbrella organizations in other countries such as the German Women's Council and the CEDAW Alliance Germany, and the National Women's Council of Ireland. Its member organizations include the Norwegian Association for Women's Rights and the Norwegian Women's Public Health Association, the oldest and largest women's organizations in Norway, respectively.

The mission of the organization is to eliminate all forms of discrimination against women and girls on the basis of the Convention on the Elimination of All Forms of Discrimination Against Women, the Beijing Platform for Action and other fundamental international agreements relating to women's human rights. It works to integrate women's perspectives into all political, economical and social processes.



History

The Norwegian Women's Lobby was founded on 27 January 2014 by eight nationwide women's rights organisations and currently has ten member organisations. The establishment was initiated by the Norwegian Association for Women's Rights (NKF) and NKF Presidents Torild Skard, Margunn Bjørnholt and Karin M. Bruzelius, and was in accordance with the recommendations of the government-appointed Gender Equality Commission (chaired by Hege Skjeie) of 2010. It is modelled after the European Women's Lobby and similar organisations. The first president was Margunn Bjørnholt, a professor of sociology and the NKF President at the time. In 2017 Ragnhild Hennum, a professor of public law, pro-rector of the University of Oslo and director of the Norwegian Centre for Human Rights, was elected president of the organisation. In 2020 lawyer Bjørk Gudmundsdottir Jonassen became president.

NWL is inclusive and "works to represent the interests of all those who identify as women and girls." The organisation aims to promote women's human rights, based on the United Nations Convention on the Elimination of All Forms of Discrimination Against Women, the Beijing Platform for Action and other fundamental international agreements. Its member organisations include all the significant women's rights organisations of Norway and have been championing women's human rights since 1884; the founding organisations were described by the Equality and Anti-Discrimination Ombud Sunniva Ørstavik as "the very foundation of the efforts to promote women's rights in Norway." As a civil society umbrella organisation, the Norwegian Women's Lobby only accepts nonpartisan organisations as members. The Norwegian Women's Lobby is led by an elected political leadership, the executive board. The organisation is advised by an independent body of experts, the Expert Committee that includes some of Norway's main experts in this area, e.g. CEDAW expert Anne Hellum and formerly Hege Skjeie.

In line with its aim to represent the interests of all those who identify as women and girls, the Norwegian Women's Lobby is trans-inclusive and opposes transphobia and the anti-gender movement. NWL has stated that "NWL understands discrimination against girls and women in an intersectional perspective and is against, among other things, racism, homophobia, transphobia and disability discrimination," and that "as feminists, we fight for all girls and women – of course also for girls and women who are trans." NWL has further stated that "trans women are women and belong in the women's movement" and that "the women's movement fights for all girls and women." Helga Eggebø, a member of NWL's expert committee, was one of the authors of a report that documented that trans people experience significantly higher levels of discrimination in Norway. NWL and its member organizations supported Norway's Gender Recognition Act of 2016. During the 2021 session of the UN Commission on the Status of Women, NKF's international parent organization, International Alliance of Women, hosted a forum on how the women's movement could strengthen feminist and queer solidarity and counter "anti-trans voices [that] are threatening feminist solidarity across borders".

The Norwegian Women's Lobby has a particular focus on the United Nations system and prepares shadow reports to the United Nations Committee on the Elimination of Discrimination Against Women on Norway's implementation of the Convention on the Elimination of All Forms of Discrimination Against Women; the 2017 report was coordinated by Supreme Court Justice Karin Bruzelius, a member of the Norwegian Women's Lobby's expert committee. The first Norwegian NGO CEDAW shadow report was initiated by the Norwegian Association for Women's Rights during Torild Skard's tenure as president, and the Norwegian Women's Lobby's reports represent a continuation of that work.

The member organizations include the Norwegian Association for Women's Rights and the Norwegian Women's Public Health Association, the oldest and largest women's organizations in Norway, respectively, as well as Legal Aid for Women (JURK), the Norwegian Female Lawyers' Association and the Secretariat of the Shelter Movement (Krisesentersekretariatet). Most of the member organizations are also participating in the Forum for Women and Development, which focuses on development issues in the Global South. The Norwegian Women's Lobby by contrast has a broader focus on women's issues nationally and internationally.

In 2018 NWL and five other key NGOs organised the customary torchlight parade in Oslo in honour of that year's Nobel Peace Prize laureates, Denis Mukwege and Nadia Murad, who were awarded the prize for their work to end the use of sexual violence as a weapon of war.

Expert Committee
NWL's Expert Committee is a permanent body of experts tasked with making policy recommendations in fields that affect women and girls and gender equality, and works under the sponsorship of the Norwegian Women's Lobby. Established in 2016, the expert committee was initially chaired by professor of sociology Cathrine Holst. The initial committee members also included supreme court justice Karin Bruzelius, professor of public law Anne Hellum, and professor of political science Hege Skjeie, the former chair of the government-appointed Gender Equality Commission. In 2020 Nita Kapoor, Helga Eggebø, Johanne Sundby and Mari Teigen were appointed to the committee.

See also
German Women's Council
National Women's Council of Ireland

References

External links 

Feminist organisations in Norway
Women's rights organizations
Organizations established in 2014
2014 establishments in Norway